Multiple-stage competition may refer to:

 Combination events, e.g. decathlon, where points are awarded for each discipline and aggregated to determine the overall winner
 Multisport race, e.g. triathlon, where competitors switch from one method of locomotion to another at different stages of the race
 Multi-stage tournament, where top competitors from one stage progress to the next
 Race stage, where times of difference stages are aggregated